Mohamed Salim Farès (born 15 February 1996) is a professional footballer who plays for Serie A club Lazio as a wing-back or winger. Born in France, he represents the Algeria national team.

Club career

Hellas Verona
Fares joined Hellas Verona in January 2013 from Girondins de Bordeaux. He made his debut on 14 December 2014 in a 2–1 Serie A away win at Udinese, replacing Alessandro Agostini in stoppage time.

SPAL
On 18 June 2018, Fares signed with SPAL on loan from Verona until 30 June 2019.

On 1 July 2019, he signed permanently with SPAL.

Lazio
On 1 October 2020, Fares signed a five-year deal with Lazio.

Loans to Genoa and Torino
On 31 August 2021, Farès joined Genoa on loan until 30 June 2022.

On 14 January 2022, he moved on a new loan to Torino, with an option to buy. His season ended four days later due to an injury received in training.

Career statistics

Club

International

Honours

International
Algeria
 Africa Cup of Nations: 2019

References

Living people
1996 births
Sportspeople from Aubervilliers
Association football defenders
Algerian footballers
Algeria international footballers
French footballers
French sportspeople of Algerian descent
Hellas Verona F.C. players
S.P.A.L. players
S.S. Lazio players
Genoa C.F.C. players
Torino F.C. players
Serie A players
Serie B players
2019 Africa Cup of Nations players
Algerian expatriates in Italy
French expatriate footballers
Expatriate footballers in Italy
Footballers from Seine-Saint-Denis